Nancy J. Turbak Berry (born September 17, 1956) is a former Democratic member of the South Dakota Senate, representing the 5th district from 2006 to 2010.

Early life and education
Nancy Turbak was born in Watertown, South Dakota. She started school in a one-room schoolhouse in Kranzburg, South Dakota. She attended Harvard University where she graduated cum laude with a B.A. in government. She then went on to obtain her J.D. at the Boalt Hall School of Law at UC Berkeley.

Career
Turbak practiced in a Minneapolis law firm for a number of years before returning to her hometown of Watertown, South Dakota in 1982. She started the Turbak Law Office in Watertown, South Dakota and was a sole practitioner until her son, Seamus Culhane, a USD Law graduate, joined her practice in 2011.
Turbak Berry is a former magistrate of the Unified Judicial System, and served for four years as in the South Dakota State Senate.

Personal life
She is the mother of two sons, Seamus and Liam Culhane, and is married to another trial attorney, David Berry of Hilton Head, South Carolina.

References

External links
South Dakota Legislature - Nancy Turbak Berry official SD Senate website

Project Vote Smart - Senator Nancy J. Turbak (SD) profile
Follow the Money - Nancy Turbak Berry
2008 2006 campaign contributions
 Turbaklaw.com

South Dakota state senators
Living people
Women state legislators in South Dakota
Harvard College alumni
UC Berkeley School of Law alumni
1956 births
21st-century American politicians
21st-century American women politicians
20th-century American lawyers
21st-century American lawyers
South Dakota lawyers
People from Watertown, South Dakota
20th-century American women lawyers
21st-century American women lawyers